The Women's singles luge competition at the 1992 Winter Olympics in Albertville was held on 11 and 12 February, at La Plagne.

The final results saw the third ever occurrence of female siblings on the same individual's event Olympic podium, with Austrian sisters Angelika Neuner (gold) and  Doris Neuner (silver) repeating the achievement of sisters Marielle Goitschel and Christine Goitschel in both the Innsbruck 1964 slalom and 1964 giant slalom.

Results

References

Luge at the 1992 Winter Olympics
Luge